Javier de Andrés Guerra (born 3 October 1967) is a Spanish politician. A member of the People's Party, he served as Deputy General of Álava from 2011 to 2015 and as Delegate of the Government in the Basque Country from 2016 to 2018.

Biography
Javier de Andrés was born in Vitoria-Gasteiz in 1967. He studied journalism at the University of the Basque Country, and later obtained a master's degree in finance. He was the People's Party candidate for Deputy General in the 2007 election. Despite the People's Party obtaining the most seats in the General Assembly, Xabier Agirre of the Basque Nationalist Party was elected Deputy General.

He was elected Deputy General after the 2011 election with support from the Socialist Party. Despite leading the most voted candidacy again in 2015, he was succeeded by Ramiro González of the Basque Nationalist Party, whose party had obtained more seats in the General Assembly. He was elected in 2016 to the Basque Parliament. He resigned after less than three months when he was named Delegate of the Government in the Basque Country.

References

1967 births
Living people
People from Vitoria-Gasteiz
Politicians from the Basque Country (autonomous community)
People's Party (Spain) politicians
Deputies General of Álava
Members of the 11th Basque Parliament
Basque journalists
20th-century Spanish journalists
21st-century Spanish journalists
University of the Basque Country alumni